Derbent is a town and district of Konya Province in the Central Anatolia region of Turkey. According to 2000 census, population of the district is 14,372 of which 7,440 live in the town of Derbent.

Its area is 300 km², of which approximately 10 km² is irrigable and the total area of 156 km² is agricultural land. The remaining part is settlements, forest and pasture land. In the Ottoman Period, the word "derbent" was used to mean department. In this sense, the outposts used in passages and straits on mountains are called "derbents".

Derbent remained within the borders of the Eshrefids Principality during the Seljuk period. Eşrefoğulları Principality borders includes the borders of Ilgın, Bolvadin and Akşehir after Beyşehir and Seydişehir. Cities such as Bozkır, Şarkîkaraağaç , Yalvaç, Gelendost, Kıreli, Doğanhisar and even Çal were sometimes included within the borders of the principality.

Notes

References

External links
 District governor's official website 
 District municipality's official website 

Populated places in Konya Province
Districts of Konya Province